A teloblast is a large cell in the embryos of clitellate annelids which asymmetrically divide to form many smaller cells known as blast cells.  These blast cells further proliferate and differentiate to form the segmental tissues of the annelid.  Teloblasts are well studied in leeches, though they are also present in the other major class of clitellates: the oligochaetes.

Developmental role and morphology 

All teloblasts are specified from the D quadrant macromere after the second round of divisions post-fertilization. There are five pairs of teloblasts, one on each side of the embryo. Four of the teloblasts (N, O, P, and Q) give rise to ectodermal tissue  and one pair (M) gives rise to mesodermal tissue. The column of blast cells arising out of each teloblast is known as a bandlet.  All five bandlets coalesce into one germinal band on each side of the embryo, extending out from the teloblast towards the head (in the rostral direction). The teloblasts are located at the rear of the embryo.

Teloblasts have two separate cytoplasmic domains: the teloplasm and the vitelloplasm. The teloplasm contains the nucleus, ribosomes, mitochondria, and other subcellular organelles. The vitelloplasm contains mostly yolk platelets. Only the teloplasm gets passed onto the daughter stem cells after cell division.

O/P specification 

The O and P teloblasts are specified from two separate but identical precursors, which form an equivalence group These two precursor cells are termed O/P cells for their ability to become either O or P teloblasts. Signals from the surrounding cells act to specify which fate the teloblasts and their progeny take on. Interactions with the q bandlet, however transient, can induce the p fate in the adjacent o/p bandlet. The M bandlet has been shown to In some species (i.e. Helobdella triserialis), the provisional epithelium covering the cells plays a role in inducing the O fate. In the absence of cell-cell interactions, the O/P precursors will become O teloblasts. O and P bandlets exhibit very different mitotic patterns (see figure) which are used to identify them in experimental manipulations.

Segmental fates 

The N and Q teloblasts contribute two blast cells per segment, one making up the anterior half of the segment, the second making up the posterior half of the segment.  The O, P, and M lineages contribute one blast cell per segment, but the contributions from each blast cell spans a segmental boundary.  These segmental boundaries were discovered by injecting teloblasts with cell lineage tracers after a few blast cells have already been generated.  During development, the N and Q bandlets, which eventually have 64 blast cells each, slide past the O,P,and M bandlet, which only have 32 cells.  Thus, the segmental boundaries within each bandlet are already specified before all the bandlets come into complete register.

References

Developmental biology